Annamarie Tendler (born June 9, 1985), known professionally as Anna Marie Tendler, is an American multimedia artist known for her work in photography, makeup and hairstyling, and textile crafts, with a notable specialty in handmade lampshades.  She is the author of Pin It!: 20 Fabulous Bobby Pin Hairstyles and The Daily Face: 25 Makeup Looks for Day, Night, and Everything In Between!.

Early life and education
Tendler was born in Connecticut. She is Jewish. According to an interview with Architectural Digest, Tendler studied hairstyling at Vidal Sassoon and the Make-up Designory after graduating from high school, and then studied photography at Parsons School of Design before dropping out. She received her bachelor's degree from The New School in writing and psychology. In 2018, she began pursuing an MA degree from NYU Steinhardt in costume studies.

Career
After dropping out of college her freshman year, Tendler began work as a hairstylist and makeup artist in New York City. Tendler was an early pioneer in the world of online beauty gurus. In December 2007, she created a Tumblr blog dedicated to daily makeup looks that accumulated more than 350,000 followers. Her popularity got her a writing job with MTV Style and the opportunity to attend NYFW 2011. Her tutorials have been featured in magazines such as Glamour, HelloGiggles, and DailyCandy. In 2016, she partnered with Amy Poehler's Smart Girls to create a YouTube tutorial series combining beauty with the paranormal called The Other Side.

Since 2016, Tendler has owned a business called Silk Parlor, which handcrafts Victorian style lampshades. As a makeup artist and hair stylist, she has worked on various television series and comedy specials, including: The Old Man and the Seymour, CollegeHumor Originals, John Mulaney: New in Town, Aziz Ansari: Dangerously Delicious and John Mulaney: The Comeback Kid. On Broadway, she worked on the shows Oh, Hello and Natasha, Pierre, and the Great Comet of 1812.

In 2018, Tendler had a brief appearance in an episode of Comedians in Cars Getting Coffee featuring her then-husband John Mulaney. In 2019, Tendler was featured in Mulaney's musical comedy special John Mulaney & the Sack Lunch Bunch, where she discussed her greatest fears and played a cameo role in a sketch.

In September 2021, Tendler exhibited artwork at The Other Art Fair in Santa Monica, California. The exhibition, titled "rooms in the first house", is said by her website to "chronicle the often non-linear experiences of loss, anger, and powerlessness, as well as a reclamation of identity".

In February 2022, Tendler featured on Laur Wheeler's spoken word album Birthday Card, in which she read the poem, "Well and Good".

Personal life
Tendler married comedian John Mulaney on July 5, 2014, at the Onteora Mountain House in Boiceville, New York. Their friend, comedian Dan Levy, officiated the ceremony. Mulaney often mentioned Tendler and their French Bulldog Petunia in his stand-up routines. On May 10, 2021, it was announced that Mulaney had decided to end their marriage. On July 23, 2021, Mulaney filed for divorce, which was finalized on January 6, 2022. Tendler is now based in Connecticut.

In a series of tweets on October 11, 2017, she spoke out about being groped by Ben Affleck in 2014, writing, "I would also love to get an apology from Ben Affleck who grabbed my ass at a Golden Globes party in 2014".

Bibliography

References

External links

The Daily Face Makeup
Broadway World: Annamarie Tendler

1985 births
Living people
American bloggers
American hairdressers
American make-up artists
American women bloggers
American women interior designers
Jewish American artists
People from Bethel, Connecticut
The New School alumni
Writers from Connecticut
21st-century American women
21st-century American Jews